Macaria carbonaria, the netted mountain moth, is a moth of the family Geometridae. The species was first described by Carl Alexander Clerck in 1759. It is found in the northern part of the Palearctic realm.

Adults are on wing from April to June. It is a day-flying species and can be found visiting the flowers of various plants.

The larvae feed on Arctostaphylos uva-ursi.

External links

Fauna Europaea
Lepiforum e.V.

Macariini
Moths described in 1759
Moths of Europe
Taxa named by Carl Alexander Clerck